Genny (Genevieve) Lim was born on 15 December 1946, in San Francisco, California. She is an American poet, playwright, and performer. She served as the Chair of Community Arts and Education Committee, and as Chair of the Advisory Board for the San Francisco Writers Corps. She has performed with Max Roach, Herbie Lewis, Francis Wong, and Jon Jang among others in San Francisco, San Jose, San Diego, Houston and Chicago.

Life
She graduated with her BA and MA from San Francisco State University, and later with a certificate in broadcast journalism from Columbia University in 1973. She teaches at the California Institute of Integral Studies.

She lives in San Francisco with her two daughters, Colette and Danielle.
Her papers are held at University of California Santa Barbara.

Awards
 1981 American Book Award from the Before Columbus Foundation
 Bay Guardian Goldie, Creative Work Fund and Rockefeller for "Songline: The Spiritual Tributary of Paul Robeson Jr. and Mei Lanfang," collaboration with Jon Jang and James Newton.
 James Wong Howe Award for Paper Angels (Premiered July 2000, UC Zellerbach Playhouse).

Works
 
 
 Contributed to This Bridge Called My Back in 1981. 
 Featured poet in festivals that took place in Venezuela, Sarajevo, Italy and Bosnia-Hercegovina (2007).

Poetry

Plays

Anthologies

References

External links

"Genny Lim, Poet and Beyond", Jaime Wright
"Genny Lim", doollee

1946 births
Asian-American feminists
San Francisco State University alumni
Columbia University Graduate School of Journalism alumni
New College of California faculty
Living people
American dramatists and playwrights of Chinese descent
American writers of Chinese descent
American women dramatists and playwrights
American Book Award winners
21st-century American women